Mark Graham Boocock (born 11 June 1963) is a former English first-class cricketer.

Born at Leeds, Boocock played minor counties cricket for Cheshire from 1987 to 1991, making 24 appearances in the Minor Counties Championship. Cheshire were permitted to play List A matches in the NatWest Trophy during this time, but Boocock did not feature in any of Cheshire's one-day List A matches. After playing for Cheshire, Boocock continued to feature in club cricket, and was selected to tour Bangladesh with the Marylebone Cricket Club in January 2000, playing in three fixtures during the tour, including one first-class match against Bangladesh. Boocock did not bat during the match, but did bowl a total of 19 overs of leg break, going wicket-less. This match marked his only appearance in first-class cricket.

References

External links
Mark Boocock at ESPNcricinfo
Mark Boocock at CricketArchive

1963 births
Living people
Cricketers from Leeds
Alumni of Liverpool John Moores University
English cricketers
Cheshire cricketers
Marylebone Cricket Club cricketers